Roluos, also Phumi Roluos Chas, is a small town and khum (commune) of Svay Chek District in Banteay Meanchey Province in north-western Cambodia. It is located on road 56, 24km north of Sisophon.

Villages

 Baek Chan Thmei
 Khvav Kaeut
 Stueng
 Ta Ong Kaeut
 Slaeng
 Roluos
 Ta Sman

See also
 Roluos (temples) - the early Angkor temples known as the "Roluos group" are located in another village with the same name, part of the district of Prasat Bakong, in the province of Siem Reap.

References

Communes of Banteay Meanchey province
Svay Chek District
Towns in Cambodia